Ryan Martin is an American soccer coach. He is the head coach of Loudoun United FC, a second division affiliate of D.C. United. He was previously an assistant coach with FC Cincinnati.

References

Living people
American soccer coaches
Year of birth missing (living people)
USL Championship coaches
Loudoun United FC
FC Cincinnati non-playing staff
Place of birth missing (living people)